The SS William Edenborn was a  long Great Lakes freighter that had a 62-year career on the Great Lakes. She was built by the West Bay City Shipbuilding Company of West Bay City, Michigan. She was originally built for the American Steamship Company, in 1900. At the time of her launch she was the largest vessel on the lakes, this is why she was given the title Queen of the Lakes. In 1901 she was sold to the Pittsburgh Steamship Company.

Mataafa Storm

The captain of Edenborn feared the loss of his crew, and his ship and made the decision to cut Madeira loose. Shortly after this Madeira crashed into Split Rock. The first mate of Madeira went down with the ship. Two days later the tug Edna G rescued the stranded crew members of Madeira. On that same day Edenborn ran aground and broke in two near Split Rock.

Final years of service

In 1952 Edenborn was transferred to U.S. Steel. She served until 1962 when she was decommissioned, stripped, and sunk as a breakwater at Cleveland, Ohio. She currently is buried under  of dredgings from the Cuyahoga River.

See also

Mataafa Storm

SS Lafayette
SS Ira H Owen

References

External links
Mixstory 1905

1900 ships
Ships sunk as breakwaters
Maritime incidents in 1905
Ships built in Bay City, Michigan
Queen of the Lakes
Ships powered by a triple expansion steam engine
Shipwrecks of the Ohio coast